The 2007 Canada rugby union tour of New Zealand was a series of matches played in June 2007 in New Zealand by the Canada national rugby union team.

Results 

Canada
tour
Canada national rugby union team tours
tour
Rugby union tours of New Zealand